Zarda, commonly known as Power Princess, is a fictional character appearing in American comic books published by Marvel Comics. Multiple versions of the character have appeared, each from alternate realities in Marvel's multiverse.

Publication history
The original version of the character was created by J. M. DeMatteis and Don Perlin, and first appeared in Defenders #112 (October 1982) as a member of the Squadron Supreme, an analog of the Justice League. More recently, the character joined the reality-hopping Exiles.

Another version of the character appeared in Marvel's MAX imprint title Supreme Power.

Fictional character biography

Squadron Supreme

Princess Zarda of Earth-712 lived on Utopia Isle, a small island in the southern sea, untouched by outside civilization. The Utopians believe themselves to be the result of genetic experimentation conducted upon humanity by the alien Kree; they are, indeed, the equivalent on the Squadron's Earth of the Inhumans. While most humans were making flint spearheads, the Utopians developed an advanced culture based on peace, fellowship and experience or learning. On their little island community, people knew no poverty, injustice, war, crime, or sexual discrimination. After the outside world made the first atom bomb, the Utopians believed their way of life was in jeopardy. Building a starship, they left Earth to find a new home. Princess Zarda chose to remain behind as their sole emissary to the Earth, a role she had assumed some years earlier as Power Princess. During this time, she was a member of the World War II team known as the Golden Agency, along with fellow members American Eagle and Professor Imam, the Sorcerer Supreme of the Squadron's Earth.

Living in Capitol City, she became the common-law wife of Howard Shelton, a sailor whom she met during "the war". Howard was the sole survivor of a sinking ship and the first outsider Zarda met. Howard aged normally while Zarda appears to be the same age as she was when they met, 50–60 years earlier.

As a member of the Squadron Supreme, Zarda became brainwashed by the Overmind. She battled the Defenders, but was cured. She then battled the Overmind and Null, the Living Darkness alongside the Defenders.

To prevent such a thing from happening again, she resolved with the Squadron to assume control of the government of the United States of her world. With the Squadron, she battled the Institute of Evil. For a time, the Hyperion of Earth-616 masqueraded as his Squadron Supreme counterpart and developed an attraction to Zarda. Disgusted that she was already committed to the elderly Shelton, the villainous Hyperion suffocated Shelton and began romancing Zarda. Upon the return of the Earth-712 Hyperion, the truth was revealed and the impostor was destroyed. Although initially confused about her feelings for her teammate, Zarda and Hyperion eventually began a romantic relationship. Zarda then assumed leadership of the Squadron. Zarda participated in the final battled between Nighthawk, who had turned against the Squadron, and his Redeemers. She then disbanded the Squadron.

Defending the Earth-712 against an attack by the Nth Man, Power Princess and the Squadron Supreme were stranded on Earth-616. They encountered Quasar, and relocated to Project Pegasus. Power Princess was among the Earth heroes trying to save New York City from Eon's dying body. Some time later, with the help of the Avengers, the Squadron Supreme were returned to Earth-712. On arrival, they find a dictatorial regime has taken over the world in their absence, and they have become fugitives.

Proteus, enemy of the interdimensional Exiles, showed up in the Squadron's reality and tricked them into battling the Exiles, taking advantage of the distraction to move on to another reality. With the Exiles' assistance, the Squadron expose the corrupt government. Power Princess then invites herself into the Exiles, and under her guidance the team eventually defeats Proteus. Power Princess remains with the Exiles for a time to continue fixing damaged realities, but eventually leaves to return to the Squadron Supreme.

Eventually, Earth-712 is destroyed by an Incursion, two realities colliding into one another. Zarda is the last survivor of her universe, escaping via an interdimensional portal. However, in transit she is attacked by an alternate version of herself called Warrior Woman, who drains Zarda of her energy and powers and leaves her for dead. Zarda survives, landing on Earth-616, and dedicates herself to stopping her evil duplicate.

Supreme Power

This Zarda debuted in Supreme Power #2. Apparently a Greek goddess who slept in a mausoleum for millennia, at one point she wakes up and finds the injured Hyperion, healing him. She alludes to having similar origins to Hyperion (both are aliens) and a mission to colonize and conquer the planet, but she is quite erratic, confusing her memories with allegory.

After separating, Zarda goes on a rampage, disregarding human life and private property. She attempted to remove Doctor Spectrum's power prism but the crystal's intellect contacted her. It informed her that she was "broken" in some way (apparently referring to her seeming insanity) and that it could not fix her despite her request to do so. She then was attacked by Amphibian in retaliation for harming Spectrum. It is indicated that both Doc Spectrum and Zarda have energy halos around them that bear an obvious resemblance to alien beings (Spectrum only exhibits this when the prism crystal takes control of him, revealing its origin and intelligence). Doc Spectrum subsequently has no memory of the exchange, revealing further that his prism has the ability to control him when it wants to. Later, Zarda kills a woman and steals her identification in hopes of starting anew, while working in a women's clothing store.

After that she made herself known to the federal government of the United States, as Claire Debussy (it is implied that Zarda murdered the real Claire Debussy and assumed her identity, as a scorch mark in the shape of a young human female is seen on a wall overlooking a pile of ash in her apartment.) But running her background down is hard. She said that her codename is Zarda, but at her power level the government did not push it. Later a liaison officer asks her to fill in some identification and non-disclosure forms, but Zarda lies to the officer, saying she can not remember details due to an "accident". After General Richard Alexander asks why she calls herself Zarda, thinking it to be an old nickname, he informs her that focus groups came up with Power Princess. After he asked her what she thought about the name, she said Princess of Power would be better, but the General said that it was already copyrighted (referring to She-Ra: Princess of Power, a cartoon related to He-Man and the Masters of the Universe).

An African general named John M'Butu, a fast-rising tribal leader gifted with a powerful psychic suggestion ability and calling himself the Voice, is leading a genocidal campaign in the Salawe region of Uganda. The US government identifies him as a superhuman after he survives an assassination attempt. The team is sent to the region to assassinate him, but early in the fight, Hyperion, Doctor Spectrum and Amphibian are affected by M'Butu's power to control anyone who hears his voice. M'Butu commands the trio to hunt down their comrades. Zarda immediately notices that there is another voice in Hyperion's head and not the One True Voice. Zarda manages to free Doctor Spectrum by calling to the voice within the Power Prism, which takes control of Spectrum, and frees Hyperion.

Later the Squadron are then ordered to take down insurgents in Ilam Province in Iran, an operation called "Long Walk". Zarda goes on a killing rampage. After Stanley Stewart sees her killing three unarmed soldiers, calling them harmless, Zarda says "Harmless, yes, for that minute. Now they are harmless tomorrow". After seeing Inertia help a little girl find and kill four men of her tribe who stoned her mother and older sisters to death after they were raped by insurgents, Zarda said Inertia is now like her.

Hyperion gives a press conference in Los Angeles of the "Long Walk" mission, during which he is confronted by Redstone. During their fight, Zarda intervenes, beating Redstone badly, but stops short of killing him when Hyperion has her fly Redstone's nuclear warhead into the stratosphere to prevent it from detonating in Los Angeles. She even survives the direct nuclear blast, something Hyperion obviously would not survive so easily.

The Squadron Supreme invade the Ultimate universe after their world is devastated by a threat that originated there. At the resolution of this conflict, Zarda decides to remain in the Ultimate universe to keep an eye on things.

Later she fights and easily beats the Ultimate Universe's equivalent of the Wrecking Crew as well as the Hulk. After the short battle with the Hulk, she and the Hulk have sex. She also contemplates how the local heroes keep her from simply killing those who annoy her. She recalls how she often goes naked in her homeworld, not seeing a need to cover up her own beauty. Zarda remains with the Ultimates during the Ultimatum event, assisting Reed Richards with retrieving Nick Fury from her own universe. When Loki returns to get revenge on the Ultimates, Zarda is hypnotized along with the other female members of the Ultimates into attacking her teammates by Amora the Enchantress. When Amora is killed, Zarda is freed, and returns to her own universe.

Zarda, along with the rest of her universe's squadron, is killed by the forces of the Cabal during an Incursion.

During the Secret Wars storyline, Zarda is shown to live in the Supremia Province in Battleworld. She is later killed during a battle with Squadron Sinister of Utopolis during an invasion on the Supremia Province when Doctor Spectrum incinerates to ashes with energy.

Squadron Supreme of America
A variation of the Zarda Shelton version of Power Princess appears as a member of the Squadron Supreme of America. This version is a simulacrum created by Mephisto and programmed by the Power Elite. Power Princess was programmed to be a lustful power woman from Utopia Isle who wore a special necklace to dampen her powers when in her secret identity as a professional boxer.

In the team's first mission, Power Princess and the Squadron Supreme of America fought Namor and the Defenders of the Deep, when they targeted a Roxxon oil platform off the coast of Alaska.

Then, the Squadron Supreme visited another oil platform in the Gulf of Mexico. The Squadron Supreme then made short work of Namor and the Defenders of the Deep.<ref>Free Comic Book Day 2019 #Avengers. Marvel Comics.</ref>

During the War of the Realms storyline, Zarda was in the middle of a boxing class when she and the other members of the Squadron Supreme of America were summoned to Washington D.C., where Phil Coulson brought them up to speed with Malekith the Accursed's invasion. Power Princess and the Squadron Supreme of America fight an army of Rock Trolls and Frost Giants. After the Squadron Supreme caused the Frost Giants to retreat, Phil Coulson sends them to Ohio, which has become a battleground.

Power Princess was with the Squadron Supreme when they attempted to apprehend Black Panther, when he infiltrated the Pentagon to confront Phil Coulson.

Powers and abilities
Squadron Supreme
Zarda possesses superhuman strength, agility, speed, reflexes, and has the ability to fly. Her aging process is extremely slowed, although she stated that she does not age at all in the Exiles series. She is able to drain the life force of others.

Zarda carries a transparent shield of Utopian design that can block tank shells and be used to redirect energy, and which she can throw so that its edges are able to slice through metal.

Power Princess has extensive experience in hand-to-hand combat (according to her, she has over five centuries of combat experience) and is skilled in discus throwing. She has undergone advanced graduate level studies in both Utopia Isle and Cosmopolis.

Supreme Power
In addition to similar physical abilities she shares with Hyperion, such as supersonic flight, super-strength, greatly enhanced reflexes, superhuman senses and nigh-invulnerability, this Zarda has the ability to drain the life-force of others to rejuvenate herself. She uses a similar life force transfer to heal Hyperion when he receives life-threatening injuries. While it is possible to hurt her, she apparently even survived a direct nuclear explosion through a combination of her nigh-invulnerability and her life-force transference capabilities. Like Hyperion, she is able to survive the vacuum of space unaided for a considerable amount of time, enabling at least interplanetary travel via her flight capabilities.

 Reception 

 Accolades 

 In 2017, CBR.com ranked Power Princes 8th in their "15 Fiercest Warrior Women In Comics" list.
 In 2019, CBR.com ranked Power Princess 3rd in their "10 Most Powerful Members Of The Squadron Supreme" list.
 In 2020, CBR.com ranked Power Princess 5th in their "Marvel: 5 Strongest (& 5 Weakest) Members Of Squadron Supreme" list.
 In 2021, Screen Rant ranked Power Princess in their "10 Most Powerful Members Of The Squadron Supreme" list.

Other versions

 Squadron Sinister 
A version of Zarda called Warrior Woman appears in the 2015 Squadron Sinister miniseries, and later joins the Earth-616 iteration of the Squadron Supreme posing as the Earth-712 version of the character.

In other media
Television
 Power Princess appears in The Super Hero Squad Show episode "Whom Continuity Would Destroy!", voiced by Susan Eisenberg. This version possesses telekinetic powers and has a variety of invisible items such as an "invisible steamroller" and "invisible gyrocopter" in addition to her invisible shield.
 Zarda appears in Avengers Assemble'', voiced by April Stewart. She first appears in flashback in the episode "Hyperion", and later appears in person in "Dark Avengers", along with the rest of the Squadron Supreme. In "Secret Avengers", Zarda fights Crimson Dynamo for the keys to a specific power source, only to be repelled by the eponymous team. In "Midgard Crisis", Zarda amplifies zoo animals to get close to the Avengers, claiming that she wants to switch sides. When Thor finds Zarda on her island, she puts him through her rigorous training process to secretly generate tidal waves to flood Manhattan. When the Hulk arrives, he tries to help Thor, only for Zarda to amplify him into a monstrous form. Thor manages to help Hulk regain control and regress back to normal before the other Avengers arrive and Zarda escapes. In the episode "Avengers' Last Stand", Zarda joins the Squadron Supreme in enacting Nighthawk's plot against the Avengers. In the episode "Avengers Underground", Zarda engages Iron Man, Thor, and Falcon, but ends up trapped alongside fellow Squadron Supreme member Nuke before all of the Squadron are remanded to the Vault. In "Prison Break", Zarda joins forces with Typhoid Mary and Crimson Widow to escape the prison, but they are defeated by Captain Marvel and the Wasp.

References

External links
 Power Princess at Marvel.com

Comics characters introduced in 1982
Fictional characters with superhuman durability or invulnerability
Fictional murderers
Fictional princesses
Fictional women soldiers and warriors
Marvel Comics characters who can move at superhuman speeds
Marvel Comics characters with superhuman strength
Marvel Comics female superheroes
Marvel Comics superheroes
Squadron Supreme